Federico Andueza Velazco (born 25 May 1997) is a Uruguayan footballer who plays as a centre-back for Central Córdoba on loan from Plaza Colonia.

References

External links

1997 births
Living people
Uruguayan footballers
Uruguayan expatriate footballers
Uruguay youth international footballers
Association football defenders
Montevideo Wanderers F.C. players
Club Plaza Colonia de Deportes players
Central Córdoba de Santiago del Estero footballers
Club Atlético Sarmiento footballers
Uruguayan Primera División players
Argentine Primera División players
Uruguayan expatriate sportspeople in Argentina
Expatriate footballers in Argentina